USS LSM(R)-190 was a United States Navy LSM(R)-188-class Landing Ship Medium (Rocket). She was built at Charleston Navy Yard, Charleston, South Carolina and was commissioned on 21 November 1944. LSM(R)-190 took part in the Battle of Okinawa from 7 April–4 May 1945. She was hit and sunk by a Japanese suicide plane on 4 May 1945 while on the radar picket line. She later received a Navy Unit Commendation for her service off Okinawa.

Design History (Friedman)
The LSM(R)-190 was one of twelve amphibious ships that evolved during World War II as battle experience identified new weapon requirements for the invasion of the Japanese home islands. The origins of the LSM(R) can be traced to a British Admiralty lend lease request for special amphibious transports to land tanks for the invasion of France.

This presented two design problems. It required the design of oceangoing ships that could safely and efficiently travel from the US to England and second; include shallow drafts for beach landings.

During October 1941 Major R. E. Holloway, Royal Engineers, brought to the attention of the US Navy an idea patented by Otto Popper of Bratislava, Czechoslovakia in 1924 of a barge transporter for use on the Danube River that flooded down to allow barges aboard, then pumped out it tanks to lift them out of the water. Norman Freidman reports that on 4 November 1941 this concept led to the breakthrough design by John C. Niedermair, civilian technical director, BuShips preliminary design section, based on ballasting techniques used on submarines that solved both design problems. This led to the construction of thousands of US Navy amphibious ships including the original LST's and with hundreds of incremental improvements modifications and conversions of LTC's, LCM's and LSM's.

British and US visionaries instrumental in supporting the concept include Captain Thomas A Hussey, COHO, and Sir Henry C. B. Weymss of the British mission to the US, Captain Edward Cochrane BuShips, the Army's Chief of Staff General George C. Marshall and Winston Churchill when he personally pushed the project for special amphibious ships and won President Roosevelt's reluctant approval.

This decision proved providential a short time later with the Japanese attack on Pearl Harbor. The design criteria for the US Navy amphibious forces for the invasion of Japan was already underway.

In 1944 with the US Navy BuOrd's mounting of a 5-inch/38 gun and state of the art rocket launchers on the LSM its mission changed and the LSM(R) became the "ultimate" landing troop fire support out to 4,000 yards beyond the beach, designed for interdiction, harassment, destruction, illumination and high trajectory fire to destroy reverse slope targets for the invasion of Japan.

Service History (Turner)
During World War II the ship was assigned to the Asiatic Pacific theater. At that time the fleet was under the command of Admiral Spruance and named the Fifth fleet. Vice Admiral Richmond Kelly Turner was Commander of Amphibious Forces Pacific and was to be in charge of operations until the beachhead was established. The Kerama Retto islands were a small chain of islands 15 miles west of the southwest tip of Okinawa. The invasion of the Kerma Retto was an opportunity to break in all twelve of the 188-class LSM(R)s. One of the reasons that Admiral Turner wanted to capture Kerama Retto was his knowledge that the Japanese Sea Raiding Units had suicide boats hidden there. On the morning of 29 March three of these boats attacked the USS LSM(R)-189 but were promptly destroyed. On 1 April 1945 the southern half of the six-mile-wide Okinawa invasion beach was assigned to Task Force 55, commanded by Rear Admiral John Leslie Hall, Jr. The assault troops were under Major General John R. Hodge. The southern support craft included LSM(R)s 189, USS LSM(R)-190, USS LSM(R)-191, USS LSM(R)-192, and USS LSM(R)-193. The northern half of the six-mile-wide invasion beach was assigned to Task Force 53, under the command of Rear Admiral Lawrence F. Reifsnider. The LSMR's involved in the invasion as part of the Northern Tractor Flotilla included USS LSM(R)-194, USS LSM(R)-195, USS LSM(R)-196, USS LSM(R)-197, USS LSM(R)-198, and USS LSM(R)-199.

On 3 May 1945 the 188-class LSM(R)'s were put to the test and were not found wanting. The action at the picket stations proved that the courage and punishment endured by US Navy personnel was unrelated to the size of the ship. The Japanese launched their fifth kikusui attack on 3 May. Picket station 10 was the hardest hit. Shortly before dusk, the destroyer USS Aaron Ward was hit by a series of six kamikazes, suffering 45 killed or missing and 49 wounded. The ship survived, but was later decommissioned because her damage was too severe. About the same time, approximately 20 planes attacked destroyer USS Little. She was crashed by four of them and sank within 12 minutes of the first hit. She lost 30 dead or missing and 79 wounded. USS LSM(R)-195 was also on Picket Station 10 and while rushing to the aid of the Aaron Ward and the Little was likewise crashed by a kamikaze. The crash started her rockets exploding and knocked out the fire main and auxiliary pumps. LSM(R)-195 had to be abandoned and, after being ripped by heavy explosions, sank. The following day the ordeal for the LSM(R)'s reached its tragic climax. The day dawned bright and ominous. LSM(R) 190 was patrolling at Picket Station 12. Not long after sunrise the anticipated kamikazes arrived and were met by American combat air patrol. Several of the Japanese planes managed to get through and attack the ships on this station. Three kamikazes crashed LSM(R) 190. The ship that had seen so much previous action and had been credited with rescuing 180 survivors of other stricken ships was herself sunk. In the same attack the destroyer USS Luce was sunk, carrying 126 of her 312 officers and men with her. At the same time as LSM(R) 190 was fighting her final battle, USS LSM(R)-194 was facing the same fate at Picket Station 1. This was the most critical station on the picket line. The capture of the Kerama Islands did not come without a price. On the night of 28 March, Japanese planes from Okinawa airfields made a special attack on the small patrol craft assembled between the islands and Okinawa. About a dozen were shot down, but one crashed into USS LSM(R)-188. There were 15 men killed and another 32 wounded. The badly damaged ship survived, but she was sent back to Pearl Harbor and saw no further combat. No one realized at the time that this was a preview of what this class of ship would suffer six weeks later on the picket line.

Small Boys With Twice the Striking Power of the Battleship Iowa (Stewart)
The LSM(R) was heralded in the 16 April 1945 Life Magazine with a centerfold picture. "Each of these tiny ships had amazing firepower, greater at short range than the combined firepower of two mammoth Iowa class battleships", ran the caption. The interim group of 12 LSM(R)s transited the Panama Canal and via San Diego, Honolulu, and the Philippines, headed for battle against Japan in March 1945. Unaware of their destination, the crews were nonetheless well equipped and trained. In a preliminary assault on 26 March 1945, they laid down a rocket barrage at dawn on Kerama Retta, a small cluster of islands off the southwestern shore of Okinawa. Their objective: to allow the 77th Infantry Division of the U.S. Army to swiftly land and secure the islands and the harbor for protection of the hospital, supply and communication ships, and floating drydocks. The early dawn assault surprised the Japanese. The marines took control with a minimum of casualties and established this area as a haven for damaged ships.

Okinawa Radar Picket Line ( C.T.G. 52.21)
The American defense against the kamikazes was to have fighters intercept the Japanese as early as possible. Sixteen radar picket stations were established around the island, in some cases almost 100 miles out, to give early warning of the Japanese planes which might be coming from any direction. Each station was manned around the clock by a handful of ships ranging from destroyers down to minesweepers. Their job was to sound the alarm and vector fighters to intercept before the Japanese could attack the fleet anchored off Okinawa and the Allied forces and supply dumps ashore. Unfortunately, some of the eager-to-die Japanese wanted to attack the first American ships they saw: the pickets. Dennis L. Francis LSM Commander, Flotilla Nine for the period 2 – 20 April, Action Report indicated that . . ."these ships are not particularly suited for picket duty. Since their primary function is to deliver rockets during invasion operations, it seems feasible that subjecting them to continual enemy air attack will allow this secondary duty to seriously effect their ability to perform their primary function due to damage. They have no great value in combating enemy air craft due to the absence of air search radar, adequate director control for the 5"/38 main battery, and director control for the 40mm single guns. The fact that they carry a considerable quantity of explosive rockets in their magazines presents another hazard. In general, it is believed that assigning them to picket duty should be avoided since it means risking the operation of a limited number of specialized ships which could be performed by any number of other landing craft whose primary function is more closely coincident with screening operations." Before these recommendations were implemented the USS LSMR-195 was sunk by Kamikaze aircraft on 3 May 1945 with 9 killed and 16 wounded, the USS LSMR-190 was sunk by Kamikaze aircraft on 4 May 1945.

Sinking of USS LSM(R)-190 (MacKay)
4 May 1945 Radar Picket Station 12 off the coast of Okinawa, as reported by Lt.(jg) George T. Harmon, Executive Officer. The attack on LSM(R) 190 began at 0808 with a Dinah flying over the stern dropping a bomb which missed.  This plane was hit by our automatic weapons.  Thereupon the plane turned over, returned and dived into the 5"/38 mount, setting it on fire.  Shrapnel resulting from the plane crash severely injured the CO, Lt. Richard J. Saunders USNR, rendering him prostrate and immediately killed the Gunnery Officer, Ensign Stuart C. Bjorklund. As their wounded skipper slipped in and out of consciousness, the LSM(R) 190 continued steaming under the last order given to the helm prior to the crash—full right rudder at flank speed.  Reacting quickly, Radioman William J. Nuber, standing Phone Talker watch on the bridge, took over the Wheelhouse and conned the ship until relieved by the wounded Communications Officer Ensign Lyle Tennis.
The 5"/38 mount was practically knocked off its foundation and set on fire that spread to the Handling Room and After Storage Space.  The sprinkler system to the magazines and the after rocket assembly room were ordered turned on and fire hoses broken out from amidships and played on the 5"/38 mount.  However, as the fire mains had been ruptured, pressure was negligible, and the Damage Control Parties commenced breaking out lines from the auxiliary fire pump.

A second kamikaze attacker approached low above the water from the port beam, then crashed into the upper level of the engine room.  Wreckage of this plane remained stuck into the side of the ship.  Fires broke out in the engine room and the crash disabled the auxiliary fire pump.  Smoke was so thick that it was impossible to see engine controls. Lt.(jg) Engineering Officer Gordon Etter, remained in the engine room until and permission was granted to abandon the area as fires turned it into a virtual blast furnace. A third Japanese plane came after the LSM(R)190 about 0824 as the ship attempted evasive maneuvers and zigzagging at flank speed.  The twin engine fighter crossed from port to starboard about mast head height, it dropped a bomb that missed widely by some 700 yards.  By now the ship was all but defenseless with every gun out of action except the starboard abaft 20mm. Two minutes later a fourth plane attacked in 'sneak' fashion releasing a bomb which hit the Mk. 51 Director tub. A fifth plane, a Val, dove from a considerable height pursued by Corsairs of the CAP which arrived on the scene.  This plane crossed from port aft of the starboard 20mm causing no damage.

As the fires were now beyond control and ship had developed a decided port list it was decided to abandon ship.  The body of Ensign Bjorklund and the wounded CO were carried down from the Conn by officers Etter and Tennis and placed in life rafts.  Twenty minutes later (0850) approximately the ship went down.  As the abandoned, burning LSM(R)190 sank beneath the waves those in the water felt the violent explosions from the rocket ship.

USS LSM(R) 190 Lost 14 killed and 18 wounded was awarded the Navy Unit Commendation, for meritorious service in action against enemy Japanese Kamikaze aircraft.  Operating on the advanced flank at Okinawa on radar picket stations, heroically repelled numerous suicide attacks, being responsible singly for the destruction of several enemy aircraft.  It participated in the rescue of survivors from sinking ships to a total of one hundred eighty.  When finally succumbing to Kamikaze attacks, which directly hit the ship, fought gallantly until she sank. Her courageous determination and effort were keeping with the highest traditions of the US Naval Service.

Tribute To Those Who Served (Turner)
The victory at Okinawa was never in doubt, but the price paid was very, very high. The numbers for American casualties were the highest of any campaign against the Japanese. Total casualties were 49,151, of which 12,520 were killed or missing and 36,631 were wounded. Of this number the Navy casualties were 4,907 killed or missing and 4,824 wounded. The ship losses were 36 sunk and 368 damaged, with many of the damaged ships never being returned to combat readiness. Approximately 110,000 Japanese were killed. These numbers rung up during the last campaign of World War II, may seem appalling, but in hindsight would have seemed small in comparison to the casualties on both sides had the invasion of Japan taken place as planned.

References 

Brown, David. Warship Losses of World War Two. Arms and Armour, London, Great Britain, 1990. .
Friedman, Norman "US Amphibious Ships and Crafts" Naval Institute Press, Annapolis, MD 2002.
LSM-LSM(R) WW II Amphibious Forces Vil II, turner Publishing Co. 1996.
Stewart, James M. "90 Day Naval Wonder" 2003.
Dennis L. Francis CO LSM Flotilla NINE C.T.G. 52.21 April 2–20, 1945.
MacKay Ron Jr.The U.S. Navy's "Interim" LSM(R)s in World War II, McFarland & Company, Inc.,Publishers 2016.

World War II auxiliary ships of the United States
LSM(R)-188-class landing ships medium
1944 ships
L
L
Maritime incidents in May 1945